Swansea University Rugby Football Club is a Welsh amateur rugby union club based at Swansea University, Swansea. It competes in the BUCS Rugby Union Super Rugby League as of the 2021/2022 season. The club has experienced major success, winning the UAU Championship six times and the BUSA Championship twice. Swansea are also the current champions of Wales having won the 2022 Welsh Varsity in the Freshers, Women's and Men's varsity match.

The club was founded in 1920. They play at Sketty Lane, also known as Sketty, in the city of Swansea.

History

Formation and early history 
University College Swansea was formed in 1920 and the rugby playing students soon organised themselves into an active club. Although other Welsh University Colleges at Aberystwyth, Cardiff and Bangor had been well established for many years previous, Swansea soon proved, during the first twenty years of its existence, that it was one of the most successful and leading rugby playing universities in Wales and England. By 1930 the relatively small and tight knit campus of approximately 400 students was benefiting from the influx of players produced by local rugby playing schools. Young student players came from such areas as Carmarthen, Llanelli, Gwendraeth Valley, Amman Valley, Gowerton, Neath and Port Talbot as well as Swansea. Rugby fixtures were played against neighbouring "second class" clubs but the 'bread and butter' competitions were provided by the University of Wales Championship. This progressed through to the University Athletic Association (U.A.U.) competition which included the best of the English Universities. Until the establishment of the Sketty Lane playing fields around 1936, facilities were provided on the Singleton Campus and at St. Helens, the home of Swansea RFC.

1930s 
The 1930s proved to be a "golden era" with a number of student players and university teams gaining unprecedented success. In 1929 the College XV include three players who would later achieve great distinction by captaining Wales at senior level – Watcyn Thomas, Claude Davy and Idwal Rees. Later, student Haydn Tanner (1936–1939) also captained his country in the post World War II period. He became a British Lion (1938) and one of the few players to represent his country before and after the war. When Swansea RFC (the "All Whites") defeated New Zealand in 1935, six Swansea University students (past and present) played in the "All Whites" three-quarter line – Granville Davies, Ronnie Williams, Gwyn Griffiths, Clause Davey, W TH Davies and Haydn Tanner.

Not surprisingly, with such playing talent available, Swansea University proved to be an exceptionally successful team in the U.A.U. Championship. They were winners in 1933, 34, 35, 36, 37 – losing finalists in 1938 and champions again in 1939 after defeating Loughborough by six points to three at Cheltenham, under the captaincy of Sid Harris. By the outbreak of World War II Swansea had deservedly gained a reputation for being one of the foremost colleges in England and Wales – a reputation achieved in a short period of time and with comparatively few students. The U.A.U. Championship was cancelled at the outbreak of hostilities but the College still continued to field a XV with students who were allowed to continue their studies and supplemented by those evacuated to Swansea from the University of London.

Post-war
In the immediate post-war period returning service men soon helped to re-establish the College's reputation on the rugby field whilst also creating a strong social ethos. The University of Wales Championship was again won in 1946/47 and 1947/48. Viv Davies captained the side in 1948/49 and later went on to give stalwart service to Swansea RFC as a player and administrator. However, in the 1940s and 50s the U.A.U. Championship trophy eluded Swansea until 1965 when, captained by Glyn Morgan, they shared the title with Durham University. During this period three former students, Alun Thomas (Wales and British Lions), Ken Richards and Brian Davies were "capped" for their country.

1970s 
By the 1970s the venue of the U.A.U. Final had been established at Twickenham, the headquarters of the RFU. This helped the Championship gain extra kudos and it was not long before Swansea made its first appearance there in 1973, losing to a strong Loughborough side. In 1976 the 1st XV again reached the Final, along with 2nd and 3rd XV, indicating the strength in depth that was developing in Swansea.

1980s and 1990s 
During the 1980s and 90s there was a hint of another "golden era" when Swansea University 1st XV appeared in four consecutive Finals from 1988 to 1991, but with no victory. In 1995 Swansea again reached the Final of the now newly named British Universities Sports Association (BUSA) championship, which included an increased number of "newer" universities. In a magnificent game against West London Institute (now Brunel University), and in spite of scoring four tries to one against the opposition, Swansea were pipped by 31 points to 30. As if not to be deterred, there were successful returns to the BUSA Twickenham finals in 1998 and 1999 when Swansea carried off the trophy in two successive years under the captaincy of Ben Williams (1998) and Ben Martin (1999). The 2nds XV also won their BUSA Final in 1999.

It is not surprising that during the successful times of the 1980s and 90s, when Swansea was again regarded as one of the best university teams in England and Wales, some outstanding players were attracted to study at Swansea. There were excellent opportunities for development. Mark Wyatt progressed from 3rd XV Captain to 1st XV Captain and on to play full back for Swansea RFC and Wales. Over twenty students went on to represent Wales and England. Also, Mark Schieffler and English born Mark Williams played for Canada whilst Ed Macedo  played for Portugal. Paul Throrburn and Robert Howley both captained Wales, whilst in addition to Robert Howley, Gwyn Evans, Dafydd James, Dwayne Peel, Stephen Jones and Alun Wyn Jones became British and Irish Lions.

At a lower, but no means insignificant level, Swansea students regularly gained selection for leading Welsh clubs, Wales U21, Wales Students and Wales Universities., while a considerable number continued their studies at Oxford or Cambridge and won "blues". Regular fixtures were played against "Oxbridge" teams. In the early days of the WRU Challenge Cup competition the University side played Llanelli and Glamorgan Wanderers at Sketty Lane and Newport at Rodney Parade. These games added colour to the fixture list. In 2002 the University reached the final of the Heineken Students European Championship, and played against French side, University of Pau at St. Helen's.

2000s 
Since the turn of the new millennium Swansea has again laid down markers indicating its strength and depth as a rugby playing university. With the 1st XV competing at the highest level of BUCS rugby and the ever growing Welsh Varsity being the highlight of the season against local neighbours Cardiff the Club is striving to develop to the highest levels in the post professionalisation era. With internationals Alun Wyn Jones (2006), Jonathan Spratt (2009) and U20s Ciaran Ruddock (2009) all hailing from Swansea University, great successes in the Welsh Varsity and the continuing high levels of play found throughout all teams at the university, it seems that new life has been breathed into the Club and a new era in Swansea proud history is beginning.

It is not only on the playing side of Swansea students have excelled for many have reached the top echelons of rugby officiating and administration. Chris White is a former international referee who officiated at three Rugby World Cups and has been in charge of three Heineken Cup Finals. Former 1930s and 40s students Gwyn Roblin, Hermas Evans and Alun Thomas became presidents of the Welsh Rugby Union. Hermas and Raynor Jones also both chaired the International Rugby Football Board (IRB). Ex Wales international Mark Bennet also went on to become the fitness coach of the Wales national team. Richard Lancaster, Head coach of the team during one of its most successful periods in recent times has gone on to coach the Ospreys Under 20s and is currently Head Coach at Swansea RFC

Over the years the University Rugby Football Club has been well served and supported by students and staff. Amongst the latter, the contributions of Vernon Jones, I G Evans, Professor Bryn Gravenor, Professor David Herbert, Dr David Treharne, Roger Elias, Gei Lewis, Richard Lancaster, Stan Addicott and Professor Steve Mellalieu have made valuable contributions to the Club, alongside those committee member David Matthews has also been a bastion of great support. The constant interest of the Athletic Union is very much appreciated. Nowadays, with excellent sporting facilities at Sketty Lane, a growing student population of over 10,000 and with four teams regularly representing the University in university championships, the Rugby Club continues to thrive and provide both competitive and social opportunities for students.

Coaching staff

1st XV 
Head Coach and Forwards Coach:  Hugh Gustafon

Backs Coach and Kicking Coach:  James Hook

Strength and Conditioning Coach: Gareth Beer

Team Manager: Siwan Lillicrap

2nd XV 
Head Coach and Forwards Coach:  Huw Sutton

Team Manager: Max Nagy

3rd XV 
Forwards Coach:  Chris Paddison

Team Manager and Head Coach:  Hamish Minton

Backs Coach:  Garin "Meathead" Lloyd

4th XV 
Head Coach and Forwards Coach:  Max Harris

Team Manager and Backs Coach:  Jocko Dowdall

Club Captains 

1st XV :  Ben Gregory

2nd XV :  Dave Armstrong

3rd XV :  Will Field

4th XV :  Max Harris

5th XV :  Luke Ogbourn

Barbarian Captain : Evan Jones

Club Officials 

President :  Dylan Rigby

Treasurer :  Joseph Dowdall

Secretary :  Toby Simmonds

Junior Club Captain :  Will Field

Social Secretary : Iwan Burrows & Will Savage

Club Legend :  Will "Urine Sinker" Ladd

Welsh Varsity Match 

Each year Swansea University and Cardiff University clash in the Welsh Varsity Match. The inaugural match was played in 1997 at the Cardiff Arms Park, the home of Cardiff RFC. In its early years of the Varsity, the match was held alternately between St Helen's Rugby Ground and the Cardiff Arms Park, until 2003, where the match was moved to the neutral venue Brewery Field, the home of Bridgend RFC. The match was then held at the home of Cardiff RFC for 3 seasons between 2007 and 2009. After outgrowing the Arms Park, the match was moved to Swansea's Liberty Stadium.

Swansea have dominated the event, winning 9 out of the 14 previous matches, drawing only once in 2001. The Rugby Club can boast to have had some of Wales' most talented young players donning the Green and White of Swansea, ranging from the British & Irish Lion Alun Wyn Jones who helped Swansea gain victory in the 2005, to Welsh International Jonathan Spratt helping Swansea to victory in the 2007 match as well as Professional players such as the Ospreys' Ben Lewis, the Scarlets' Rhys Lawrence and Wales 7s player David Evans.

The Varsity match has become the highlight to the University sporting calendar year, with the match regularly attracting over 10,000 supporters, that include students, university staff, parents and officials. Due to its popularity among students and rugby fans alike, the latest Varsity, the 15th annual match, took place at the home of Welsh Rugby, the Millennium Stadium. The 2011 Match was also broadcast live on S4C, while also featuring on BBC Wales' Scrum V programme.

After the success of the 2011 event, it was announced that the Varsity Match will once again be held in the Millennium Stadium on Wednesday 2 May 2012.

Honours

UAU Champions 

1932–1933

1933–1934

1935–1936

1936–1937

1938–1939

1964–1965

BUSA Champions 

1997–1998

1998–1999

International honours 

 Haydn Tanner – Wales and British & Irish Lions

 Gwyn Evans – Wales and British & Irish Lions

 Alun Thomas – Wales and British & Irish Lion

 Rob Howley – Wales and British & Irish Lions

 Dafydd James – Wales and British & Irish Lions

 Alun Wyn Jones – Wales and British & Irish Lions

 Dwayne Peel – Wales and British & Irish Lions

 Watcyn Thomas

 Claude Davy

 Idwal Rees

 Ken Richards

 Brian Davies

 Mark Wyatt

 Paul Thorburn

 Mark Bennett

 David Weatherley

 Andy Williams

 Ian Buckett

 Richie Pugh

 Tal Selley

 Jonathan Spratt

 Adedayo Adebayo

 Mark Williams

 Mark Schieffler

 Ed Macedo

 William De Robillard

 Saman Rezapour

 Steve Howorth

Age Grade International honours 
 Colin Langley – Wales u15s u18s u21s

 Mark Langley – Wales u21s 
                 
 Daniel George – Wales u21s

 Joel Galley – Wales u20s

 Rhys Lawrence – Wales u20s

 Reuben Tucker – Wales u20s

 Ciaran Ruddock – Ireland u20s

Welsh rugby union teams
Swansea University
Sport in Swansea